The 4th Ohio Infantry Regiment was an infantry regiment in the Union Army during the American Civil War. It served in the Eastern Theater in a number of campaigns and battles, but perhaps is most noted for its actions in helping secure Cemetery Hill during the Battle of Gettysburg.

Three-months regiment
With the outbreak of the Civil War, President Abraham Lincoln called for 75,000 volunteers to help put down the rebellion. Ohioans responded well, and several new regiments were enrolled for a term of three months, thought to be long enough to end the war. The 4th Ohio Infantry Regiment was organized April 25, 1861, at Camp Jackson in Columbus, with Lorin Andrews as its colonel. The regiment moved to newly constructed Camp Dennison near Cincinnati on May 2, and served on garrison duty there until June 4, at which time, many of the men joined the newly reorganized a three-years regiment with the same numerical designation. Those three months men who elected not to join the three-years regiment were mustered out on July 24, 1861.

Among the enlistees in Company I were future U.S. Congressmen Archibald Lybrand and James S. Robinson.

Three-years regiment

Early service
The three-years 4th Ohio Infantry was organized at Camp Dennison on June 4, 1861. After a few days of training and drilling, it moved to Grafton, Virginia (now West Virginia) on June 20–23, where it was attached to Alexander M. McCook's Advance Brigade, West Virginia, until July. As part of the 3rd Brigade, Army of Occupation, the regiment saw action in the West Virginia Campaign, capturing the Confederate-held town of Beverly on July 12. They remained on duty in western Virginia through the balance of the year, fighting in several small skirmishes and battles.

In January 1862, the regiment became a part of the 2nd Brigade, Lander's Division, Army of the Potomac until March 1862, when they were reorganized into the 1st Brigade, Shields' 2nd Division, Banks' V Corps in the Department of the Shenandoah. The brigade saw considerable action at the Battle of Kernstown on March 23, then advanced up the valley for the next few weeks, fighting again at the Battle of Port Republic on June 9 before heading to Alexandria, Virginia to rejoin the Army of the Potomac. Brigaded with the 7th West Virginia, 14th Indiana, and 8th Ohio Infantry under Nathan Kimball in the II Corps, the regiment was briefly stationed in Fort Monroe before covering John Pope's retreat from the Second Battle of Bull Run on September 1.

Although the regiment was forced to miss the subsequent Maryland Campaign due to regiment-wide sickness, Kimball's Brigade attacked Confederate positions at the Sunken Road at Antietam and suffered serious losses in a prolonged firefight, earning the nickname "Gibraltar Brigade." They marched to Harpers Ferry after Robert E. Lee's Army of Northern Virginia withdrew from Maryland, staying there until October 30, when the brigade marched towards Falmouth, Virginia. The regiment fought at the disastrous Battle of Fredericksburg in December; among the losses was their wounded Colonel James H. Godman. Then it was part of the infamous January "Mud March," one of Ambrose Burnside's follies as the commanding general of the Army of the Potomac. The 4th Ohio next saw action during the Battle of Chancellorsville under new brigade commander Samuel "Red" Carroll.

Gettysburg and 1863 actions
After spending over a month in camp after the disaster at Chancellorsville, the regiment broke camp on June 11 and marched northward to Maryland, arriving in southern Pennsylvania on July 1 well after the start of the Battle of Gettysburg. They were assigned a position along Cemetery Ridge. Much of July 2 was spent holding this position in reserve. The 8th Ohio Infantry Regiment was detached from the brigade and sent forward along the Emmitsburg Road, while the 4th Ohio Infantry and the Indiana and West Virginia regiments were later rushed up the western slope of Cemetery Hill in the gathering darkness. They arrived in time to help repulse the Louisiana Tigers of Harry Hays, who had seized several Union artillery pieces. They briefly pursued Lee into Virginia before being ordered to board ships for transport to New York City to help quell the New York Draft Riots from August 15 until September 16. Returning to Virginia, they participated in the Bristoe and Mine Run Campaigns, but saw little combat.

1864 and 1865 actions
The 4th Ohio did not see significant combat until the Overland Campaign, fighting at the battles of the Wilderness and Spotsylvania Court House in May. After a series of smaller engagements, the 4th was a part of an ill-advised charge against Confederate entrenchments at the futile Battle of Cold Harbor in June. They participated in the Siege of Petersburg from June 16, 1864, to April 2, 1865.

The old members of the regiment (the remainder of the original three-years men) mustered out June 21, 1864, and what was left of the 4th Regiment, Ohio Volunteer Infantry was consolidated to a battalion five days later. The much depleted 4th saw action in a series of engagements near Petersburg, including Deep Bottom, Ream's Station, and Hatcher's Run. They served in the Appomattox Campaign from March 28 – April 9, seeing their final major combat in the triumph at the Battle of Sayler's Creek. The victorious army marched to Washington, D.C. in early May, then participated in the Grand Review on May 23. The 4th Ohio mustered out July 12, 1865, in Columbus.

During its service, the regiment lost 8 officers and 95 enlisted men killed and mortally wounded and 3 officers and 155 enlisted men by disease, a total of 261 fatalities.

The 4th Ohio Infantry is memorialized with monuments at Antietam and Gettysburg, as well as an inscription at the Soldiers' and Sailors' Monument in Cleveland's Public Square. Its battle flags are in the collection of the Ohio Historical Society in Cleveland, and some artifacts and records in the Western Reserve Historical Society.

Another regiment (unrelated) known as the 4th Ohio served in the Spanish–American War. It was also known as the 14th Ohio National Guard.

Medal of Honor Recipient
One man from the regiment received the Medal of Honor for his actions during the Civil War:
 Lewis Morgan, Private, Company I – (Spotsylvania): "Capture of flag from the enemy's works."

See also
 Ohio in the Civil War

Notes

References

 Baumgartner, Richard A., Buckeye Blood: Ohio at Gettysburg. Huntington, West Virginia: Blue Acorn Press, 2003. .

Further reading
 Ohio Roster Commission. Official Roster of the Soldiers of the State of Ohio in the War on the Rebellion, 1861–1865, compiles under the direction of the Roster commission. 12 vol. Akron: Werner Co., 1886–95.

External links
 Ohio in the Civil War: 4th OVI by Larry Stevens
 Ohio Historical Society: Battleflags and Relics
 National Park Service: Civil War Soldiers and Sailors System
Civil War Index: 4th Ohio Infantry - 3 Months Service in the American Civil War
Civil War Index: 4th Ohio Infantry - 3 Years Service in the American Civil War

Units and formations of the Union Army from Ohio
Gibraltar Brigade
Military units and formations established in 1861
Military units and formations disestablished in 1865